Badr-ud-Duja is the third religious and spiritual album released by the Pakistani artist Junaid Jamshed, in Ramadan 2007.

Trackslisting 
 Badr-ud-Duja  
 Tala Al Badru Alyna 
 Bold and Brave 
 Dua-e-Taariq - 
 Habibi Rasooli 
 Habibi Rasooli
 Hijarat 
 Kamli Wale
 Mere Allah, Tu kareem Hai 
 Nasab Mubarak 
 O Mericiful 
 Recitation

Junaid Jamshed albums
2007 albums
Islamic music